The 2018–19 Hong Kong Senior Challenge Shield was the 117th edition of the Hong Kong Senior Shield. 10 teams entered this edition, with two games being played in First Round before the Quarter-final stage. The competition was only open to teams that played in the 2018–19 Hong Kong Premier League.

The champions received HK$150,000 in prize money while the runners up received HK$50,000. The MVP of the final received a HK$10,000 bonus.

Calendar

Source:HKFA

Bracket
{{4RoundBracket-Byes
| RD1=First Round
| RD2=Quarter-finals
| RD3=Semi-finals
| RD4=Final
| RD4b=

| team-width=14em
| score-width=3em
| score-align=

| RD1-team03=Dreams FC
| RD1-score03=1 (4)| RD1-team04= Pegasus
| RD1-score04=1 (2)

| RD1-team07= 
| RD1-score07=
| RD1-team08= 
| RD1-score08=

| RD1-team11=Tai Po| RD1-score11=5| RD1-team12=Hoi King
| RD1-score12=0

| RD1-team15=
| RD1-score15=
| RD1-team16=
| RD1-score16=

| RD2-team01=Kitchee| RD2-score01=2| RD2-team02=Dreams FC
| RD2-score02=1

| RD2-team03=Eastern| RD2-score03=2| RD2-team04=Lee Man
| RD2-score04=1

| RD2-team05=Southern
| RD2-score05=0
| RD2-team06=Tai Po| RD2-score06=1| RD2-team07=Yuen Long
| RD2-score07=1
| RD2-team08=R&F| RD2-score08=2| RD3-team01=Kitchee| RD3-score01=3| RD3-team02=Eastern
| RD3-score02=1

| RD3-team03=Tai Po| RD3-score03=3| RD3-team04=R&F
| RD3-score04=1

| RD4-team01=Kitchee| RD4-score01=3| RD4-team02=Tai Po
| RD4-score02=2
}}Bold''' = winner
* = after extra time, = penalty shootout score

Fixtures and results

First round

Quarter-finals

Semi-finals

Final

References

External links
 Senior Shield - Hong Kong Football Association

2018-19
2018–19 in Hong Kong football
2018–19 Asian domestic association football cups